The Music Production & Engineering (MP&E) Major at Berklee College of Music is notable for attempting to give students an integrated understanding of the recording and production process, rather than focusing on the engineering aspects alone. Courses cover the technologies for documenting music, as well as the collaborative elements of studio work, and the business of recording.

Berklee Online introduced a Master of Music in Music Production, and started accepting applications in February 2018. The program is designed to be completed in one year, and consists of 12 courses.

Department history
The first recording facility at Berklee was a 2-track studio in the basement of Berklee’s main building, 1140 Boylston Street. Joe Hostetter offered the first elective course in sound recording in 1972. With the encouragement of producer Arif Mardin, the college built its first 8-track studio in 1974. Within a few years, as enrollment in recording courses increased, a second 8-track studio was added. In 1977 the Department of Audio Recording was formed, with Hostetter as its first Chair.

In March 1982 Berklee Provost Bob Share hired Boston recording studio owner, Wayne Wadhams to recommend whether the school should eliminate the Audio Recording Major or create a new program with new studios and additional faculty. After discussion with Berklee faculty, students, and music industry executives, Wadhams recommended a program designed to instruct students in technical aspects of recording and production as well as the collaborative process and business affairs of labels. The Music Production and Engineering Department was established and a new major was offered in January 1983. Three new production and recording studios were designed and constructed, two of them were wired to the Berklee Performance Center, allowing live performances to be remotely recorded and monitored. A fourth, larger studio was completed in June 1983. Don Puluse was named chair of the department in August 1983. The current department chair is Rob Jaczko. The program has continued to expand its facilities, with 13 studios in operation in 2009.

Student recordings
Since 1989, MP&E has released CDs of top student projects. MP&E and Electronic Production and Design student projects are included on a Music Technology Division CD series initiated in 2007. MP&E faculty and students also produced The Darfur Project: We Are All Connected, an album of original music inspired by the Darfur Conflict. MP&E students also contribute to the student-run labels, Heavy Rotation Records and Jazz Revelations Records. Student productions air on the commercial-free Berklee Internet Radio Network (BIRN), as well.

Honors and awards
In 1985, the Society of Professional Audio Recording Services (SPARS) voted the Department best in the category of Outstanding Institutional Achievement in a Recording Program. Mix magazine presented MP&E with a TEC (Technical Excellence and Creativity) award in 1985, the first year that the competition was held. Over the next several years MP&E would win three more TEC Awards (1986, 1987, 1992).

Alumni of the Berklee MP&E Department garnered more than 40 Grammies (including 20 Latin Grammies), three Oscars, and four Emmy Awards between 1992 and 2009.

References

External links
Music Production Courses

Music education in the United States